My Little Pony: The Movie is a 2017 animated musical fantasy film based on the animated television series My Little Pony: Friendship is Magic, which itself is part of the fourth incarnation of Hasbro's My Little Pony toyline and franchise. The film was directed by Jayson Thiessen, written by Meghan McCarthy, Michael Vogel (all three of whom are Friendship is Magic veterans), Joe Ballarini, and Rita Hsiao, and produced by Stephen Davis, Brian Goldner, Marcia Gwendolyn Jones, and Haven Alexander. The plot follows the alicorn Twilight Sparkle, her five pony friends – collectively known as the "Mane 6" – and her dragon friend/assistant Spike embarking on a quest to save their home of Equestria from an evil conqueror while gaining new friends along the way while testing their friendship and their patience. The film stars the show's regular voice cast of Tara Strong, Ashleigh Ball, Andrea Libman, Tabitha St. Germain, Cathy Weseluck, and Nicole Oliver reprising their roles and the guest voices of Emily Blunt, Kristin Chenoweth, Liev Schreiber, Michael Peña, Sia, Taye Diggs, Uzo Aduba and Zoe Saldaña as new characters.

The film was produced by Hasbro's Allspark Pictures and animated at DHX Media's DHX Studios Vancouver, using traditional animation created with Toon Boom Harmony. It premiered in New York City on September 24, 2017, and was released on October 6, 2017, in the United States by Lionsgate and in Canada by Entertainment One Films (which had Canadian rights to Lionsgate titles at the time). Despite mixed reviews from critics, the film was commercially successful, grossing $61.3million worldwide on a $6.5 million budget and becoming Lionsgate's highest-grossing animated feature to date.

Plot

The ponies of Equestria prepare for their first Friendship Festival, overseen by Princess Twilight Sparkle in Canterlot. The festivities are interrupted by an army of monsters commanded by the unicorn Tempest Shadow, who is ordered by her superior, the Storm King, to capture Equestria's princesses and empower his mystical staff with their magic in exchange for restoring her broken horn. Tempest uses magical orbs to petrify the princesses except for Twilight, who escapes with her six friends: Pinkie Pie, Rainbow Dash, Rarity, Applejack, Fluttershy, and the dragon Spike.

Following incomplete instructions from Princess Celestia, Twilight and her friends sets out to find the "queen of the hippo" beyond Equestria. They arrive at the desert city of Klugetown, where they accept an offer by a con artist feline named Capper to escort them to the "hippos", unaware as he intends to sell them to settle a debt he owes to local mob boss Verko. As Capper begins to develop a genuine friendship with them, Twilight discovers an atlas that reveals the "hippos" to be hippogriffs. When the group prepare to leave, Verko arrives to buy the ponies, exposing Capper's treachery. When Tempest arrives in pursuit of Twilight, the group evades her aboard a delivery airship run by birdlike pirates, whom Rainbow Dash persuades to take them to the hippogriffs' kingdom on Mount Aris. However, she accidentally gives their location away to Tempest with a Sonic Rainboom, forcing the group to reach Mount Aris in a makeshift hot air balloon.

While exploring the hippogriffs' deserted kingdom, Twilight and her friends are  led by the seapony Princess Skystar to her home of Seaquestria in an underwater cavern. Skystar reveals her kind to be the hippogriffs, transformed by a magic pearl used by her mother, Queen Novo, to hide from the Storm King. When Novo denies them the pearl to use against the Storm King, Twilight, frustrated by her friends' irresponsible behavior throughout the journey, desperately attempts to steal it while letting her friends unknowingly distract the seaponies. Her plan backfires when she triggers an alarm shortly after Pinkie persuades Novo to give them the pearl, resulting in the entire group getting banished back to the surface. After disowning her friends during an argument over her actions, a remorseful Twilight is kidnapped by Tempest, who gains Twilight's sympathy upon revealing how the loss of her horn as a foal caused her own friends to shun her out of fear of her volatile magic.

Twilight's friends return to Canterlot to rescue her with the help of Capper, the pirates, and Skystar, who have followed them after being inspired by their friendship. Using the princesses' magic imbued into his staff, the Storm King conjures a storm against the group and betrays Tempest. Twilight saves Tempest as she and her friends reconcile, and they help her take the staff and end the storm. The Storm King hurls a magical orb at the group to petrify them, but Tempest jumps in his way, turning them both into stone. The Storm King falls and shatters, while the group uses the staff to revive Tempest, who returns the stolen magic to restore the princesses and repair the city. The Friendship Festival resumes with the ponies celebrating alongside everyone Twilight and her friends encountered on their adventure. Encouraged by Twilight, Tempest joins in by producing a fireworks display with her broken horn, and happily accepts the group's friendship.

Voice cast

 Tara Strong as Twilight Sparkle, an intelligent alicorn who is Equestria's Princess of Friendship, responsible for spreading friendship and harmony across the kingdom. She is the leader of the "Mane 6" ponies.
 Rebecca Shoichet performs Twilight Sparkle's singing voice.
 Ashleigh Ball as Rainbow Dash and Applejack, two of the "Mane 6"; Rainbow Dash is a loyal pegasus with an adventurous spirit, and Applejack is an honest apple farmer pony.
 Andrea Libman as Pinkie Pie and Fluttershy, two of the "Mane 6"; Pinkie Pie is a party-obsessed pony filled with joy and laughter, and Fluttershy is a kind and timid pegasus who cares for animals.
 Shannon Chan-Kent performs Pinkie Pie's singing voice.
 Tabitha St. Germain as Rarity, a generous fashion designer unicorn and one of the "Mane 6".
 Kazumi Evans performs Rarity's singing voice.
 Cathy Weseluck as Spike, a baby dragon and Twilight Sparkle's assistant.
 Emily Blunt as Tempest Shadow / Fizzlepop Berrytwist, an embittered unicorn who serves as the Storm King's second-in-command in order to repair her broken horn. On the development of the character, screenwriter Meghan McCarthy said, "We just arrived at this idea of a character who had come from Equestria, and had not had the positive experience that Twilight [Sparkle] and her friends had. It felt like a good counterpart to our heroes was to have a villain who didn't just not get friendship, but had a reason that she didn't understand it." McCarthy also called Blunt's performance "a big influence" on how the character was animated in the film.
 Michael Peña as Grubber, a wisecracking and gluttonous hedgehog, Tempest Shadow's cohort and the servant of the Storm King. McCarthy said that Grubber "needed to be goofy" to counterpoint the "very straight-laced, hardcore" Tempest. Peña ad-libbed much of the character's dialogue, with McCarthy saying, "You get Michael Peña in a recording booth, and you just are like, 'Please just go and say funny things.' He will be there for hours, just giving you all kinds of really great material that was not something that we had originally scripted!"
 Liev Schreiber as the Storm King, the despotic, satyr-like leader of the storm creatures who conquers lands in search of powerful magic to control the weather. On his acceptance of the role, Schreiber said that he wanted something child-friendly for his kids to watch, noting his repertoire of violent, adult-oriented films. Comparing his character to Basil Rathbone, Schreiber said the Storm King "is prone to temper tantrums, and he's a little crazy. He has a wide range of behaviors." He considers the character to be "one of the more intense roles [he's] played". 
 Taye Diggs as Capper, an anthropomorphic alley cat who is a cunning yet good-hearted con artist. Diggs, who was excited to appear in an animated film, says, "I'm very movement-oriented, so just looking at the way Capper is positioned, the expressions on his face, all enhances my performance. It's really cool."
 Zoe Saldaña as Captain Celaeno, an anthropomorphic parrot and jaded pirate captain who is relegated to the Storm King's delivery service. Saldana says Celaeno "cares for her crew", adding, "She's a responsible, thoughtful, and empathetic leader. That's a terrific, very poignant message to give to children about leadership – that it's okay for you to want to be a leader as long as you know that the responsibilities that come along with it."
 Kristin Chenoweth as Princess Skystar, an excitable hippogriff and magically transformed seapony princess. Chenoweth said of her character, "Let's just say she's been locked up for a while and is longing for friends." She joked that she dabbled in method acting for the role, making sure her hair was "on point for every recording session".
 Uzo Aduba as Queen Novo, Princess Skystar's mother and the benevolent ruler of the hippogriffs turned seaponies. The character is described by Chenoweth as "loving but also a little too strict and stern". Detailing her role, Aduba says, "She [wants] to protect her group to the best of her ability, and [wants] to create a life of peace and stability. She doesn't take any nonsense, and will do everything in her power to protect her family."
 Sia as Songbird Serenade, a pegasus and famous pop star in Equestria. The character's design is modeled after Sia's likeness.

Nicole Oliver, St. Germain and Britt McKillip reprise their respective roles from Friendship Is Magic as Twilight's mentors and fellow alicorn princesses Princess Celestia, Princess Luna, and Princess Cadance. St. Germain also voices Granny Smith, Applejack's grandmother, and Muffins, a cross-eyed gray pegasus. Michelle Creber and Peter New voice Apple Bloom and Big McIntosh, Applejack's younger sister and older brother, respectively. Michael Dobson voices Bulk Biceps, a muscular pegasus, and Samuel Vincent voices Party Favor, a balloonist unicorn.

Adam Bengis voices Code Red, one of the Canterlot ponies. Brian Dobson voices Verko, a mole-rat crime boss in Klugetown to whom Capper is in debt. Max Martini, Mark Oliver and Nicole Oliver respectively perform as three of Captain Celaeno's parrot-like crew: Boyle, first mate Mullet and Lix Spittle. Michael Dobson, Andrew McNee, Tegan Moss, Sabrina Pitre, Rhona Rees and Vincent all feature as assorted citizens of Canterlot. Richard Ian Cox, Michael Dobson, McNee, New and Nicole Oliver also perform as denizens of Klugetown. Additional voices are provided by Alistair Abell, Caitlyn Bairstow, Julia Benson, Christine Chatelain, Brian Dobson, Paul Dobson, Rondel Reynoldson, Jason Simpson, Sarah Troyer and Siobhan Williams.

Production

Development
At San Diego Comic-Con International in 2012, Friendship Is Magic head writer Meghan McCarthy commented on the possibility of a feature film based on the series, saying that it was not in her control whether or not the film would be made. The film was announced on October 20, 2014, with Joe Ballarini attached as screenwriter and McCarthy as co-executive producer. Hasbro Studios president Stephen Davis said of the film that "I think it gives us an opportunity to tell a bigger story, that maybe we [can't] tell on television" and that "[it's] also an opportunity to broaden the franchise". The film was one of the first produced through Hasbro Studios' self-financing film label Allspark Pictures, which also produced the live-action adaptation of Jem and the Holograms. During PonyCon AU on February 22, 2015 alongside fellow writer Gillian M. Berrow, McCarthy said that the movie would be unrelated to the Equestria Girls spin-off franchise, and that the crew was "going all out on it, to make sure it doesn't just feel like an extended episode".

Series supervising director Jayson Thiessen was confirmed to be directing the film while McCarthy was announced to be writing the film. McCarthy was supposed to work on season 5 of the series but left to write the film while Thiessen announced on Twitter that after the finale to season 5, he would be stepping down as supervising director of the television series in order to work full-time on the film. Michael Vogel, a writer on the series, signed on as co-executive producer alongside McCarthy, with Davis and Hasbro CEO Brian Goldner signing on as producers. Vogel, Ballarini, and Rita Hsiao were later announced as co-writers alongside McCarthy.

On April 30, 2016, concept artwork and other information was officially revealed at PonyRadioCon in Moscow; the panel included additional plot details such as the main characters' transformation into "sea ponies" for a portion of the film.

Casting
The initial Lionsgate announcement listed the principal voice cast of Friendship Is Magic – Tara Strong, Ashleigh Ball, Andrea Libman, Tabitha St. Germain and Cathy Weseluck – reprising their roles alongside actress Kristin Chenoweth as a new character. On February 12, 2016, it was announced that Emily Blunt joined the voice cast. By April 27, 2016, actors Michael Peña and Uzo Aduba were in negotiations to join the cast. On May 16, Liev Schreiber and Taye Diggs were confirmed additions to the cast. On June 20, Ball stated through Twitter that she had begun recording for the film's songs. At San Diego Comic-Con in July 2016, singer Sia was announced to be portraying a new "pop star pony" character called Songbird Serenade. On January 11, 2017, it was reported by Variety that Zoe Saldaña had joined the cast. Friendship Is Magic voice actress Nicole Oliver confirmed via Twitter on January 23 that she would also be a part of the film's cast, reprising her role as Princess Celestia.

Animation
Like the Friendship Is Magic series and earlier Equestria Girls animated spin-off films, the animation for the film was mainly done at DHX Studios Vancouver (specifically, its 2D animation unit) in Canada and outsourced to Top Draw Animation in the Philippines, with additional work from Feitong Cartoon in Mainland China and Copa Studio in Brazil just for this film.

On April 2, 2016, Michel Gagné, after receiving an email from Thiessen, both of whom having worked together on Insanely Twisted Shadow Puppets back in 2004, took an eight-month hiatus from Spider-Man: Into the Spider-Verse and joined the film as special effects lead. In early October 2016, Gagné reported that Nik Gipe was hired onto the film's staff as his assistant. He also mentioned that the film was being animated using Toon Boom Animation's Harmony software rather than the usual Adobe Flash animation software used in the television series as apparently, it was too cheap-looking to be used for a theatrical film. Several crew members, including Thiessen, Gagnè, art director Rebecca Dart, head of story Doron Mier, storyboard artist Joclean Thiessen, Thiessen's wife, and creative consultant Kevin Munroe, who was also a storyboard artist on the film, said they wanted to add "simple yet impactful changes" to the designs for the big screen, such as depth and shadows for the characters' eyes and ears, and the impression of heart-shaped indentations on the bottom of their hooves, while still keeping the look and feel of the show, which using Toon Boom enabled them to do.

According to cinematographer Anthony Di Ninno, the crew used 3D modeling in Autodesk Maya to determine camera locations, lens, angles, rough lighting, character, and prop placement, and which way the characters would be looking and expressing while the composition crew used Toon Boom and Adobe After Effects and the background paint was done in Photoshop. The pre-visualization crew were able to use the 3D backdrops, which became more detailed throughout the film's development, to integrate the 3D character models and test the Toon Boom animations on top of these scenes using the placement established by Maya, speeding up the production.

Music

The film's official soundtrack was released on September 22, 2017, by RCA Records.

The film's songs and score were composed by Friendship Is Magic songwriter Daniel Ingram, instead of the songs being composed by Ingram and the score being composed by William Anderson. Ingram first announced at GalaCon 2015 that he would be collaborating with a live studio orchestra for the film. On his songwriting for the film, Ingram said, "I had to challenge myself to push beyond what had been done in the TV show; to write bigger, more epic." It was stated through the PonyRadioCon panel that the film would have a total of eight original songs. On November 17, 2015, background score orchestrator Steffan Andrews, who left the series after season 4 ended, announced via Twitter that he would return to work on the film. The tweet in question was deleted in November 2016, but Andrews was given a special thanks credit. At Hasbro's Toy Fair investor presentation on February 17, 2017, it was announced that there would be seven songs. Around 5,800 pages of sheet music were created for all orchestral parts of the score.  Recording for the score began at Nashville on June 5, 2017, performed by the Nashville Scoring Orchestra and conducted by David Shipps, and finished on June 11 with additional music written by Joseph Magee, Caleb Chan, and Trevor Hoffman.

Sia contributed an original song to the film, "Rainbow", which was released as a single on September 15, 2017. A music video for the song later released by Entertainment Weekly on September 19. The video was directed by Daniel Askill and features a dance performance by Maddie Ziegler, a previous collaborator with Sia, intercut to scenes from the film. Danish band Lukas Graham also contributed an original song for the film titled "Off to See the World", which was used in the film's first trailer and played over the closing credits. Other artists included in the album are DNCE and CL.
The score for the film was released on Spotify on October 7, 2017. It features a song cut from the film titled "Equestria" that was originally going to play in the beginning, but was cut in favor of Rachel Platen's cover of "We Got the Beat".

The film's production wrapped up on July 29, 2017, as announced by Thiessen.

Release
On August 7, 2015, Lionsgate announced that they would distribute the film in the United States, and sell distribution rights to the film worldwide except in Mainland China. The film was showcased at the 2016 Cannes Film Festival on May 10 along with eight other Lionsgate features to help sell the film to international distributors.

The film was originally scheduled for release in the United States and Canada on November 3, 2017, but it was subsequently moved up to October 6, 2017. A private premiere screening was held in New York City on September 24, 2017, twelve days prior to the nationwide release date. In Canada, the film was distributed by Entertainment One Films, which had the nationwide rights to Lionsgate films at the time. Theatrically, the film was accompanied by a 5-minute animated short from Hasbro Studios' web series Hanazuki: Full of Treasures.

Marketing

Numerous toys based on characters, sets, and props from the film were made by Hasbro, and a vast majority of the products was released on August 1, 2017. The 2016 PonyRadioCon panel included a brief preview for some of the planned merchandise being developed for the film, including T-shirts and graphics. On July 27, 2016, the My Little Pony Collectible Card Game hinted on Twitter about a new set of cards based on the film. Hasbro's toyline for the film was shown and promoted at Toy Fair 2017 and various other toy conventions.

Several books and comics related to the film have been announced: My Little Pony: Annual 2018, which contains "exclusive content from the My Little Pony movie" was released on August 10, 2017; and a "prequel" story released on August 1. On January 23, 2017, Hachette Book Group listed five different books for the film, all released on August 29, 2017. Books based on the film have been showcased at BookCon 2017 on June 4, with guest appearances by Libman and Ball. IDW Publishing released a four-issue comic book miniseries titled My Little Pony: The Movie Prequel, with the first issue released on June 28, 2017. Viz Media released an art book for the film on August 29, 2017. A comic adaptation based on the film by IDW was released on September 27, 2017.

A teaser trailer for the film was released online on April 6, 2017, and in theaters alongside Smurfs: The Lost Village the following day. The first full trailer debuted online on June 28, 2017, and was released with Despicable Me 3 two days later. Another trailer was released by USA Today online on September 12, 2017. The same day, the official My Little Pony Facebook page hosted a live Q&A stream with two of the movie's characters, Pinkie Pie (voiced by Libman) and Twilight Sparkle (voiced by Strong). Another trailer was played during the season 12 finale of America's Got Talent on September 20, 2017. On September 27, 2017, the official My Little Pony Facebook page hosted a live Q&A stream with Dart, who drew a custom artwork of Rainbow Dash (voiced by Ball).

On September 30, 2017, a special titled The Making of My Little Pony: The Movie aired on Discovery Family, a joint venture between Discovery Communications (now Warner Bros. Discovery) and Hasbro; it was watched by 18,000 viewers.

Home media
My Little Pony: The Movie was released on December 19, 2017 for digital downloads, and was later released on January 9, 2018 for DVD, Blu-ray and On Demand. Its special features includes a deleted scene, a music video for the song "I'm the Friend You Need", a featurette starring Pinkie Pie, two behind the scenes featurettes, an exclusive Equestria Girls animated short, and the Hanazuki: Full of Treasures short bundled with the film's theatrical release.

A home media bundling both this film and the namesake 1986 film was released on October 16, 2018, commemorating the 35th anniversary of the My Little Pony toyline. The releases contain the same bonus features as its DVD/Blu-ray counterparts.

As of April 2018, My Little Pony: The Movie had sold over 200,000 DVD copies and 160,000 Blu-ray copies.

Reception

Box office
My Little Pony: The Movie has grossed $21.9 million in the United States and Canada, and $39.4 million in other territories, for a worldwide total of $61.3 million on a production budget of $6.5 million.

In the United States and Canada, the film was expected to gross between $10 million and $17 million from 2,528 theaters in its opening weekend. It made $3 million on its first day, including $290,000 from Thursday night previews. It ended up opening to $8.9 million finishing 4th at the box office behind Blade Runner 2049, The Mountain Between Us and It. Amid Amidi of Cartoon Brew stated that – despite the opening being considered a disappointment – any reasonable return from the film would be seen as positive by Hasbro because it is tied to the toy line. The film dropped 54% in its second weekend, making $4.1million and falling to 9th.

Its biggest markets outside North America are China with $7.4 million, the United Kingdom with $5 million, Germany with $2.4 million, and Russia with $2.3 million.

Critical response
On Rotten Tomatoes, the film has an approval rating of 47% based on 66 reviews and an average rating of 5.10/10. The critics consensus reads: "Charming and sweet, My Little Pony: The Movie will please its dedicated fanbase, even if it's unlikely to encourage non-devotees to gallop along for the ride." On Metacritic, the film has a score of 39 out of 100 based on 13 critic reviews, indicating "generally unfavorable reviews". Audiences polled by CinemaScore gave the film an average grade of "A−" on an A+ to F scale.

RogerEbert.com's Christy Lemire gave the film one and a half stars out of five, criticizing the screenplay: "Meghan McCarthy, Rita Hsiao, and Michael Vogel share screenwriting credits...the narrative itself is all over the place, with a multitude of underdeveloped, crammed-in characters. Plus, every once in a while, the various animals burst into song, but not in any particularly memorable way."

The Hollywood Reporter listed the film as "the worst animated movie of the year", with staff critic Michael Rechtshaffen saying, "Attention The Emoji Movie: Your status as worst animated feature of the year might well be in jeopardy when My Little Pony: The Movie trots into theaters this weekend." IGN notably gave the film the lowest rating received for a film in 2017, a 3.5 out of ten, criticizing the script and animation, and saying "The design philosophy of the show is completely subverted for the purpose of introducing new characters who aren't necessary to the story, and read like self-insert fanfic characters."

Katie Walsh of the Los Angeles Times gave the film a negative review, saying: "Truthfully, this film feels like four episodes of a cartoon strung together, and there are times, especially during some of the latter musical numbers, where it truly drags." She also criticized the film's animation, saying that it "embraces the flat, colorful, Saturday-morning cartoon look and feel". Josh Terry of Deseret News panned the film, saying that parents should "put their money into (buying) some new My Little Pony toys" rather than into getting tickets to see the film.

Gwen Ihnat of The A.V. Club gave the film a negative review, and criticized the music in the film, noting, "the ponies’ odes aren't likely to make anyone rush out to get the soundtrack; even the Sia song fails to stand out."

However, some critics praised the film's female representation. Elizabeth Weitzman of TheWrap wrote positively of the film, saying that the film, "Like its television predecessor, is all dressed up in bubbles and cupcakes and rainbows. But it's so jam-packed with rousing girl power, it passes the Bechdel Test with (literally) flying colors." Amy Nicholson of Variety called the film "at once clichéd and exceptional", praising its female characters and "emotionally wise" story.

Notes

References

External links

  (defunct, now redirected to Lionsgate website)
 
 

2017 films
2017 animated films
2010s children's animated films
2010s fantasy adventure films
2010s musical fantasy films
2010s American animated films
American children's animated adventure films
American children's animated fantasy films
American children's animated musical films
American fantasy adventure films
American musical fantasy films
Animated films about friendship
Animated films about dragons
Animated films about horses
Animated films based on animated series
Canadian animated fantasy films
Canadian animated feature films
Canadian fantasy adventure films
Canadian musical fantasy films
DHX Media films
Films based on television series
Films directed by Jayson Thiessen
Films about princesses
Films about unicorns
Hasbro brands
Hasbro Studios films
Lionsgate animated films
Lionsgate films
My Little Pony films
My Little Pony: Friendship Is Magic
English-language Canadian films
Films produced by Brian Goldner
2010s English-language films
2010s Canadian films